The flag of Buckinghamshire is the flag of the historic county of Buckinghamshire in England.  It has been in use for centuries and flew from County Hall in Aylesbury. The flag was registered with the Flag Institute on 20 May 2011.

Flag design

This is the traditional flag of Buckinghamshire which features a chained swan (The Bohun swan) on a bicolour of red and black, taken from the arms of Bucks. The swan emblem dates back to Anglo-Saxon times, when Buckinghamshire was known for breeding swans for the king.  The Bucks swan appears on the arms of some of the historic towns in Buckinghamshire, such as Aylesbury, Buckingham, Chesham, Marlow and High Wycombe.

The Pantone colours for the flag are:
Red 186
Black
White

References

External links
[ Flag Institute registration particulars]
British County Flags site

Buckinghamshire
Buckinghamshire
Buckinghamshire
Buckinghmashire